Island of Love (French: L'île d'amour) is a 1929 French silent film directed by Berthe Dagmar and Jean Durand and starring Claude France, Pierre Batcheff, and Thérèse Kolb.

Cast
 Claude France as Xénia Smith  
 Pierre Batcheff as Bicchi  
 Thérèse Kolb as La mère  
 Victor Vina as Serlys  
 Jean Garat as Harry Smith  
 Aldo Rossano as Bozzi  
 Yvonne Armor as La fiancée  
 Harry Fleming as Le danseur  
 Alice Roberts as La nurse  
 Henri Duval as Le juge  
 Berthe Dagmar as Une femme 
 Guy Favières
 Earl Leslie
 Albert Lévy 
 Mistinguett

References

Bibliography
 Rège, Philippe. Encyclopedia of French Film Directors, Volume 1. Scarecrow Press, 2009.

External links 
 

1929 films
French silent films
1920s French-language films
Films directed by Jean Durand
French black-and-white films
1920s French films